The 2005–06 Regionalliga season was the twelfth season of the Regionalliga at tier three of the German football league system. It was contested in two geographical divisions with eighteen teams in the south and nineteen in the north. The champions, Rot-Weiss Essen and FC Augsburg, and the runners-up, FC Carl Zeiss Jena and TuS Koblenz, of every division were promoted to the 2. Bundesliga.

Team movements

Promoted to 2. Bundesliga

From Nord
Kickers Offenbach
Sportfreunde Siegen

From Süd
SC Paderborn 07
Eintracht Braunschweig1

1Eintracht Braunschweig were promoted due to VfB Lübeck being barred from promotion.

Teams Relegated from 2. Bundesliga

To Nord
Rot-Weiss Essen
Rot-Weiß Oberhausen
Rot-Weiß Erfurt

To Süd
Eintracht Trier

Teams relegated to Oberliga

From Nord
VfL Wolfsburg II  
Arminia Bielefeld II 
1. FC Union Berlin
KFC Uerdingen 052
Borussia Dortmund II3

From Süd
1. FSV Mainz 05 II
FC Nöttingen
1. SC Feucht

2KFC Uerdingen went withdrew due to serious financial troubles and were relegated to the Oberliga
3Borussia Dortmund II withdrew from the Regionalliga and were also relegated to the Oberliga

Teams Promoted from Oberliga

To Nord
SG Wattenscheid 09 (Oberliga Westfalen Champions)
Kickers Emden (Oberliga Nord Champions)
Bayer Leverkusen II (Oberliga Nordrhein Champions)
FC Carl Zeiss Jena (Oberliga NOFV-Süd Champions)

To Süd
1. FC Eschborn (Hessenliga Champions)
1. FC Kaiserslautern II (Oberliga Südwest Runners-Up)4
Karlsruher SC II (Oberliga Baden-Württemberg Champions)

4Despite being champions of Oberliga Südwest, Borussia Neunkirchen were barred from promotion. Instead, 1. FC Kaiserslautern II was promoted to the Regionalliga Süd.

Regionalligas

Regionalliga Nord

Tables

Top scorers

Source: Weltfussball.de

Regionalliga Süd

Table

Top scorers

Source: Weltfussball.de

References

External links
 Regionalliga at the German Football Association 
 Regionalliga Nord 2005–06 at kicker.de
 Regionalliga Süd 2005–06 at kicker.de

Regionalliga seasons
3
Germ